Jürgen Bucher (born 22 March 1957) is a retired German footballer.

Bucher made a total of 95 2. Bundesliga appearances for 1. FC Nürnberg, MTV Ingolstadt and Tennis Borussia Berlin.

References

External links 
 

1957 births
Living people
German footballers
Association football goalkeepers
2. Bundesliga players
1. FC Nürnberg players
Tennis Borussia Berlin players